The Vision is the debut single album by the Chinese boy band WayV, released in January 2019. It was released by Label V for digital download on January 17, 2019. The EP marks the first NCT unit to debut since NCT Dream in 2016, and the debut of members Xiaojun, Hendery, and Yangyang.

Background
WayV was first announced on August 12, 2018, under the working title, NCT China. Their debut date was originally set for November of that year, though no further information was released at the time. In late November, SM announced that Winwin would be pulled from NCT 127's Regulate promotions in order to prepare for the new unit's upcoming release. In late December, the group was revealed to be known as WayV with a 7 member lineup debuting in January 2019.

After a series of video teasers released on YouTube, the album title and lead single title were released on January 12. The MV teaser was released on January 16 via SMTOWN's YouTube channel.

The Vision included two Chinese versions of songs previously released by NCT 127, "Regular" and "Come Back", and one original song, "Dream Launch".

Reception
"Regular" peaked at number nine on the Chinese QQ chart, and number three on the US World chart. "Dream Launch" peaked at numbers 15 and 6, respectively.

Track listing

Notes

References

Mandarin-language albums
WayV albums
Single albums
2019 singles